The Herald & Tribune is a paper serving Jonesborough, Tennessee. It is currently owned by the Sandusky Corporation, which runs a number of local papers and radio stations.

History 
The newspaper was established on August 26, 1869 as a four-page weekly. The first issue went to press under the direction of Dr. C. Wheeler and Dr. M. S. Mahoney, the original publishers. Initially a Republican paper, it promised to "condemn wrong and expose fraud by whom-so-ever committed." D.C. Stephenson, former Grand Dragon of the Indiana branch of the Ku Klux Klan and convicted rapist and murderer, was hired to write for the newspaper in 1961 after being asked to leave Indiana and never return as a part of his parole.

References

Washington County, Tennessee
Newspapers published in Tennessee
1869 establishments in Tennessee
Publications established in 1869